Serianthes is a genus of flowering plants in the family Fabaceae.

Selected species
 Serianthes calycina
 Serianthes germainii
 Serianthes lifouensis
 Serianthes margaretae
 Serianthes myriadenia
 Serianthes nelsonii
 Serianthes petitiana
 Serianthes rurutensis
 Serianthes vitiensis

References

 
Fabaceae genera
Taxonomy articles created by Polbot